Annulobalcis wareni is a species of medium-sized sea snail, a marine gastropod mollusc in the family Eulimidae.

Distribution
This marine species remains distributed throughout marine terrain off the coasts of Vietnam.

References

External links
 To World Register of Marine Species

Eulimidae
Gastropods described in 2012